Karen Patricia Scavotto (born 17 April 1982 in Danbury, Connecticut) is an American archer. She now resides in Enfield, Connecticut, and is an alumna of Enfield High School. She is currently ranked fifth in the world by the International Archery Federation. She competed in archery at the 2000 Summer Olympics.

References
 sports-reference

External links

1982 births
American female archers
Olympic archers of the United States
Archers at the 2000 Summer Olympics
Archers at the 2007 Pan American Games
Living people
Sportspeople from Danbury, Connecticut
Pan American Games bronze medalists for the United States
People from Enfield, Connecticut
Pan American Games medalists in archery
Medalists at the 2007 Pan American Games
21st-century American women